Okou Gnakouri Armand Olivier (born 30 January 1980), better known by his stage name Kaaris (stylized as KΛΛRIS), is a Ivorian-born French rapper, record producer, composer and actor.

Early life
Born in Cocody, a suburb of Abidjan in the Ivory Coast, Kaaris was raised in Sevran in the Seine-Saint-Denis department, northeast of Paris.

Career
Kaaris started rapping in 1999, and released his first mixtape in 2001. He returned to his native Ivory Coast for a while, but returned to France after political unrest in the country. In 2007, he released his street album 43ème Bima (pronounced "Quarante-troisième Bima"), that led to signing with a new independent label French Cut Music.

However, his meeting with French rapper Booba and producers Therapy gave him his first recording with Booba, "Criminelle league" released as part of Booba's Autopsie Vol. 4. Kaaris had his first charting hit "Kalash", credited to Booba featuring Kaaris appearing in Booba's album Futur. 

Kaaris co-writes most of his materials in cooperation with a record producer duo, known as Therapy (made up of producers 2031 and 2093). On 21 October 2013, he released his studio album Or Noir on Therapy Music / AZ / Universal Music. It is considered as one of the most important in the history of French rap. With the 2014 reissue Or Noir Part 2, the album is certified platinum.

On 30 March 2015, Kaaris released his studio album Le bruit de mon âme. The record includes featuring including Lacrim, 13 Block or Future. In October 2015, he released a mixtape titled Double Fuck. 

On 11 November 2016, he released his third studio album Okou Gnakouri. The album includes featurings with Gucci Mane and Kalash Criminel. In early January 2018, the record was certified double platinum with over 200,000 sold copies.

A year after the release of Okou Gnakouri, on 3 Novembre 2017, he released the album Dozo.

On 25 January 2019, he released the album Or Noir Part 3, going back to a trap style and following his 2013 album.

On 3 September, he released the album 2.7.0. He left Def Jam France and created his own label OG Record while signing for Lutèce Music, affiliated to Caroline France label.

On 28 January, he released a common album with French rapper Kalash Criminel titled SVR. The name of the album is a reference to Sevran, the city where both rappers come from.

Legal history 
A fight between Booba and Kaaris led to the temporary closure of Hall 1 at Paris-Orly Airport on 1 August 2018. Kaaris was given an 18-month suspended sentence and fined €50,000.

Discography

Albums

Mixtapes and street albums

Singles

*Did not appear in the official Belgian Ultratop 50 charts, but rather in the bubbling under Ultratip charts.

Featured in

Other charted songs

*Did not appear in the official Belgian Ultratop 50 charts, but rather in the bubbling under Ultratip charts.

Filmography

Films
 Braqueurs (2015)
 Overdrive (2017)
 The Bouncer (2018)
 Bronx (2020)

Music videos

References

External links
Facebook
 

1980 births
Living people
French people of Ivorian descent
French rappers
Ivorian emigrants to France
Rappers from Seine-Saint-Denis